Samuel H. "Doc" Landis (August 16, 1854 – unknown) was a Major League Baseball player who played pitcher in .

Biography
He would play for the Philadelphia Athletics and Baltimore Orioles. He was married to Mary Ida Weidner on August 1st, 1883 and lived for a time being in Reading, PA where is continued to play baseball.  They had two children together, Mary C. Landis (Allgier) and Floyd Wesley Landis.  Doc and Mary Ida would divorce around 1890. After baseball he was employed as a railroad foreman

Doc's son Floyd was also a baseball player and an actor in vaudeville, using the stage name of Patsy Flanagan.

References

External links

1854 births
1920 deaths
Major League Baseball pitchers
Philadelphia Athletics (AA) players
Baltimore Orioles (AA) players
19th-century baseball players
Philadelphia (minor league baseball) players
Philadelphia Defiance players
Philadelphia Athletics (minor league) players
Reading Actives players
Baltimore Monumentals (minor league) players
Allentown Dukes players
Providence Grays (minor league) players
Danbury Hatters players
Ashland (minor league baseball) players
Galveston Giants players
San Antonio Missionaries players
San Antonio Cowboys players
Houston Babies players
Houston Red Stockings players
Grand Rapids (minor league baseball) players
Greenville (minor league baseball) players
Baseball players from Philadelphia